Mirel Wagner is the debut album by the Finnish singer-songwriter Mirel Wagner, released in Finland in February 2011 by the indie label Kioski. It was later released in Great Britain and Europe by Bone Voyage Records in October 2011 and in North America by Friendly Fire Recordings in March 2012.

Commercial response 
The album reached No. 15 in the Finnish Album Chart in April 2011, returning for three weeks in January 2012 and reaching #23.

Singles 
The single "No Death" was released in August 2011.

Track listing

References 

2011 albums
Mirel Wagner albums